Alföldi is a Hungarian surname. Notable people with the surname include:

Andrea Alföldi (born 1964), Hungarian racewalker
Andreas Alföldi (1895–1981), Hungarian historian
Róbert Alföldi (born 1967), Hungarian actor, theatre director and television host

Hungarian-language surnames